Protorthophlebia is an extinct genus of scorpionflies, known from the Triassic and Jurassic periods of Eurasia. It was originally considered a member of the family Orthophlebiidae, but was later placed as the only genus within the family Protorthophlebiidae within the superfamily Panorpoidea.

Taxonomy 
After, with locality information after.

 †Protorthophlebia aksaji Martynova 1948 Dzhil Formation, Kyrgyzstan, Early Jurassic (Hettangian-Sinemurian)
 †Protorthophlebia cuneata Bode 1953 Posidonia Shale, Germany, Early Jurassic (Toarcian)
 †Protorthophlebia curta Hong 2009 Tongchuan Formation, China, Middle Triassic (Ladinian)
 †Protorthophlebia egloni Martynova 1948 Dzhil Formation, Kyrgyzstan, Early Jurassic (Hettangian-Sinemurian)
 †Protorthophlebia hebes Sukatsheva 1985 Uda Formation, Russia, Late Jurassic (Oxfordian/Kimmeridgian)
 †Protorthophlebia ladinica Hong et al. 2002 Tongchuan Formation, China, Middle Triassic (Ladinian)
 †Protorthophlebia latipennis Tillyard 1933 (type) Blue Lias, England, Hettangian Charmouth Mudstone Formation, England, Early Jurassic (Sinemurian)
 †Protorthophlebia lecta Sukatsheva 1985 Ichetuy Formation, Russia, Late Jurassic (Oxfordian)
 †Protorthophlebia punctata Soszyńska-Maj & Krzemiński 2019 Daohugou, China, Middle Jurassic (Callovian)
 †Protorthophlebia strigata Zhang 1996 Xishanyao Formation, China, Middle Jurassic (Aalenian/Bajocian)
 †Protorthophlebia triassica Hong et al. 2002 Tongchuan Formation, China, Middle Triassic (Ladinian)
 †Protorthophlebia yanqingensis Hong and Xiao 1997 Houcheng Formation, China, Late Jurassic (Oxfordian)

References 

Mecoptera